Gandhara was an ancient region in north-western South Asia, which existed until the 6th century CE.

Gandhara may also refer to:

 Gandhāra (kingdom), an Iron age kingdom in Gandhara.
 Gandhara Kingdom, the kingdom as described in the Hindu epics
 Gandhara grave culture, an archaeological culture from the 156th centuries BCE
 Greco-Buddhist art, also known as Gandhara art
 Gandhara University, a university in Pakistan
 Gandhara (moth), a genus of moths
 "Gandhara" (song), a song by Japanese rock band Godiego
Gandhara, the third note in the Indian classical music scale

See also 
 Gandharva (disambiguation)
 Gandara (disambiguation)
 Gandahar (disambiguation)
 Ganadhara, a concept in Jainism
 Kandhara, a village in Orissa, India